The 2004 Chadian coup d'état attempt was an attempted coup d'état against the Chadian President Idriss Déby that was foiled on the night of May 16, 2004.

Plot
The coup attempt was at first presented by the government as a fairly contained military mutiny over pay and conditions of service, with the Information Minister Moktar Wawadajab assuring the BBC that the mutiny had ended without a shot being fired, and that no-one was killed or injured. While the rebellion was rapidly quelled by loyalist forces after a brief exchange of fire, and the about 80 rebels and their ringleader, the army Colonel Bechir Haggar, were arrested, the President later admitted the seriousness of what had happened. In a televised address to the nation on May 18 Déby confirmed that elements of the GNNT and of the Presidential Guard had made an attempt on his life: "A group of fanatic and manipulated officers tried to disrupt the functioning of republican institutions on the night of May 16 … Their hidden agenda was the assassination of the President."

Motivations
The possible reasons behind the failed coup are judged to be mainly two by observers. The first of these, and the most evident, is linked to the decision by Déby to search a third presidential mandate, modifying the Constitution with the help of the solid majority he could count on in the National Assembly; precisely in the day of the coup the necessary constitutional amendments were being rushed through the Parliament. This generated strong tensions in the inner circles of power, especially among the Zaghawa, Déby's ethnic group; and the coup saw the participation of senior Zaghawa officers, and important political allies of Déby were thought to have been involved, like Daoussa Déby, half-brother of the President, and the Erdimi twins, Tom and Timam, nephews of Déby. The suspicions regarding Daoussa Déby were to prove groundless, while on December 12, 2005 the Erdimi brothers were accused by the government of being the true masterminds behind the failed coup. The two were also to be the key architects in yet another coup d'état attempt that took place in 2006.

Another possible reason may be linked to Déby's foreign policy decisions regarding the Darfur conflict; in the conflict involving the Darfur rebels and the Sudan-supported Janjaweed, at the time Déby was attempting to maintain good relations with Sudan, a choice that made many Senior Chadian officers unhappy, many of whom were reportedly supporting the insurgents logistically, politically and financially. Relations with Sudan were to worsen dramatically the following year, leading to the Chadian-Sudanese conflict.

See also
Chadian coup of 1975
2006 Chadian coup d'état attempt
History of Chad

Notes

External links
Army mutiny quelled in N'djamena
 Brève mutinerie à N'Djaména

Conflicts in 2004
Coup d'etat, 2004
coup d'etat attempt
Chad
Attempted coups d'état in Chad
Military history of Chad
Military coups in Chad
May 2004 events in Africa